The Petroleum (Hawkers’) Act 1881 (44 & 45 Vict. c. 67) is an Act of the Parliament of the United Kingdom to regulate the hawking or selling of petroleum and similar substances.

Background 
In the 1870s concerns had grown about the safety of carrying petroleum and similar hazardous commodities around in carts particularly in urban areas. The activities of Hawkers’ of petroleum were controlled, in general terms, under the provisions of the Petroleum Act 1871. However, offences were regularly committed. For example:

 In  1871 in Newport Isle of Wight an ironmonger was 'going round in cart and hawking petroleum' without a licence (Southampton Herald 16 Dec 1871).
 In 1874 in Bristol a man was summonsed for hawking petroleum without a licence (Bristol Mercury 5 December 1874).
 In 1876 in Sheffield a lamp and oil dealer was charged with hawking petroleum from door to door contrary to the terms of his licence (Sheffield Independent 21 January 1876).

In a legal case in the 1870s the Court determined that petroleum could not be kept for hawking unless the cart was licensed. Law Officers decided that a cart could not be licensed as it was not a place.

Legislation was seen as necessary to better regulate this trade. Petroleum (Hawkers’) 1881 was enacted to remedy this deficiency. The quantities of petroleum carried for hawking were also specified as a maximum of 20 gallons (91 litres).

Petroleum (Hawkers’) Act 1881 
The Petroleum (Hawkers’) Act 1881 (44 & 45 Vict. c. 67) received Royal Assent on 27 August 1881. Its long title is ‘An Act to regulate the hawking of petroleum and other substances of a like nature’.

Provisions 
The Act comprises 7 Sections:

 Section 1 Power to hawk petroleum
 Section 2 Regulations for hawking petroleum, including: amount of petroleum not to exceed 20 gallons; conveyed in a closed vessel free of leakage; ventilated to avoid an explosive mixture; no fire or naked light to be brought dangerously near; carriages to prevent escape of petroleum; care to prevent escape into building or drain; precautions to prevent fire or explosion
 Section 3 Modifications of conditions of licence under the Petroleum Act 1871, previous condition made under Petroleum Act 1871 are void
 Section 4 Power of constable as to prevention of offences, to seize and retain petroleum, vessels or carriage believed to contravene conditions
 Section 5 Saving of rights of municipal boroughs, no authority to hawk petroleum if forbidden
 Section 6 Definitions, carriage and hawker
 Section 7 Short title and construction

This Act shall be construed as one with the Petroleum Acts 1971 and 1979 and together may be cited as the Petroleum Acts 1871 to 1881.

Consequences 
Offences under the 1881 Act occurred, for example:

 In 1887 in Springfield Essex a petroleum hawker was summonsed for an offence under the Petroleum Hawkers’ Act (Essex Standard 30 April 1887).
 In 1889 in Chelmsford an oil man and grocer was summonsed under the 1881 Act for allowing a light to ‘get dangerously near to his carriage’, while hawking petroleum (Essex Standard 9 November 1889).
A parliamentary select committee on petroleum met in 1898. It identified deficiencies in the law in respect of the keeping, selling, using and conveying of petroleum. It specifically identified that further provisions should be made for the hawking of petroleum oil and petroleum spirit. However, no immediate changes to the existing legislation were made.

The Petroleum Act 1871 was repealed by the Petroleum (Consolidation) Act 1928.

The Petroleum (Hawkers’) Act applied to Ireland and remained a statute of the Republic of Ireland until 1972  when it was repealed by the Dangerous Substances Act 1972.

See also 

 Petroleum Act

References 

Law of the United Kingdom
History of the petroleum industry in the United Kingdom
United Kingdom Acts of Parliament 1881